The P-GRADE Grid Portal was software for web portals to manage the life-cycle of executing a parallel application in grid computing.
It was developed by the MTA SZTAKI Laboratory of Parallel and Distributed Systems (LPDS) at the Hungarian Academy of Sciences, Hungary, from around 2005 through 2010.

Features 

By building onto the GridSphere portal framework, the P-GRADE Portal hides details of grid systems with high-level interfaces that can be integrated with middleware. It offers portlet based access to the following services:
 definition of grid environments
 creation and modification of workflow applications
 management of grid certificates
 controlling and execution of workflow applications on grid resources
 monitoring and visualization of workflows and their component jobs.

The P-GRADE Portal allows multi-user development and execution of workflows, and also provides support for workflow level grid interoperation.

The portal supports middleware technologies including Globus Toolkit, European Grid Infrastructure (LCG or gLite) and Advanced Resource Connector.

License and support 

The P-GRADE Portal was developed under the GNU General Public License.
The 2.9 version introduced features such as Portable Batch System (PBS) and Platform LSF cluster support, EDGes 3G Bridge resource support, local PS port support and extended NorduGrid (ARC) support.
Release 2.10 of P-GRADE was announced in November 2010.

Installations 

The P-GRADE Portal served grid communities in research and industry, providing access to Grids including:
 EGEE Grids - through the P-GRADE Multi-Grid portal
 South-Eastern European Grid - through the P-GRADE Multi-Grid portal
 NGS Grid (UK) - through the NGS P-GRADE GEMLCA Portal
 The Belgian Grid for Research (operated by BELNET)- through the BEgrid Portal
 KnowledgeGRID Malaysia (operated by MIMOS) - through the KnowledgeGRID Malaysia P-GRADE Portal
 CLGrid (Chile)- through the CLGrid Portal
 and others, listed on the P-Grade Portal homepage.

Applications 

Application specific portals can be created by adding application specific portlets to P-GRADE portal, omitting some generic purpose portlets and hiding the underlying workflow within an application specific portlet.

Applications include:
 The parallel version of MadCity, a discrete time-based traffic simulation, developed by the University of Westminster and MTA-SZTAKI. In this case the legacy code of MadCity is deployed in a service-oriented Grid architecture and accessed through a user-friendly Web interface
 Parallelization and gridification of air pollution forecast on the HUNGRID infrastructure, with P-GRADE Portal providing a flexible and unified way for parallel application development and multi-grid development
 Gridification of OMNeT++, a public-source, component-based, modular, discrete event simulation environment. OMNeT++ is frequently used in a wide area of  simulation applications due to its strong GUI support and embeddable simulation kernel. The P-GRADE Portal environment was successfully integrated with the OMNeT++ simulation framework to enable large-scale grid resources to the simulation user community, providing significant performance increase for OMNeT++-based simulations.
 Since 2008 applications were listed on the LPDS Grid Application Support Centre web site.

Related services 
The Grid Application Support Centre (GASuC) was established in 2008 within the Laboratory of Parallel and Distributed Systems and supported as part of the European Grid Infrastructure.
GASuC provides assistance in porting legacy applications onto grid infrastructures.

See also 
 Grid computing
 National Grid Service UK
 MTA SZTAKI Laboratory of Parallel and Distributed Systems
List of free and open-source software packages

References

External links 
 P-GRADE Portal

Grid computing